Beraldo is a surname. Notable people with the surname include:

Eros Beraldo (1929–2004), Italian footballer and manager
Giovanni Beraldo
Paul Beraldo (born 1967), Canadian ice hockey player
Wilson Teixeira Beraldo (1917–1998), Brazilian physician and physiologist

See also
Berardo